In the Russian Federation, law enforcement is the responsibility of a variety of different agencies. The Russian police (formerly the ) are the primary law enforcement agency, with the Investigative Committee of Russia as the main investigative agency, and the Federal Security Service (FSB) as the main domestic security agency.

Agencies 

Ministry of Internal Affairs:
 The Police of Russia  provide public security functions. Formerly the 
 Main Directorate for Drugs Control
 The Investigative Committee of Russia is an investigative body, sometimes described as the "Russian FBI".
 Ministry of Justice:
 Federal Service of Punishment Execution (FSIN) is responsible for the penal correction and prison system of Russia
 The Federal Security Service (FSB) is the domestic security service, and the main successor agency of the Soviet-era Cheka, NKVD, and KGB. Responsible for anti-terrorism operations.
 The Federal Border Guard Service is subordinate to the FSB and responsible for border protection, surveillance and coast guard.
 Federal Customs Service
 The Ministry for Civil Defense, Emergencies and Elimination of Consequences of Natural Disasters (EMERCOM) is responsible for the civil defence regulation, protection from fire and has own troops.
 Ministry of Defence
 Russian Military Police provides the service police function for all branches of the Russian Armed Forces.
 The National Guard (formerly Internal Troops, OMON, and SOBR) provide a gendarmerie function, supporting the Politsiya and dealing with large-scale riots and internal armed conflicts. They also provide security for highly-important facilities (such as nuclear power plants).
The Federal Protective Service of Russia is responsible for the protection of Russian state property and high-ranking government personnel, including the President of Russia.
Presidential Security Service - concerned with the tasks related to the protection of the President of Russia.

Prisons 

Prisons in Russia are administered by the Federal Penitentiary Service (FSIN) and can be categorized under four types of facilities: pre-trial institutions; educative or juvenile labor colonies; corrective labor colonies; and prisons.

The corrective colony (ispravitelno-trudovaya koloniya, ITK) is the most common, with 760 institutions in 2004 across the many administrative divisions of Russia. There were also eight prisons, 62 juvenile facilities, and 192 pre-trial facilities in 2004.

See also
 Crime in Russia
 Russian Intelligence Community

References

External links